Netball at the 2001 Arafura Games in Darwin, Australia was held from 20–25 May 2001.

Results

Pool games

Semi-final

Gold-medal match

Final standings

See also
 Netball at the Arafura Games

References

 PNG Netball Results & Tournaments since 1991. Papua New Guinea netball webpage

2001
Arafura Games
2001 in Australian netball
May 2001 sports events in Australia